Wardensville School was located in Wardensville, West Virginia.  The school building is still standing today. In 1980 the Wardensville and Mathias School consolidated and became East Hardy High School. The Wardensville School mascot was the Warrior.

References

Defunct schools in West Virginia
Educational institutions disestablished in 1980
Educational institutions in the United States with year of establishment missing
Former school buildings in the United States
Schools in Hardy County, West Virginia